Zada Mary Cooper (January 31, 1875 – May 6, 1961) was an American pharmacist and educator.

Biography
Born in Quasqueton, Iowa in 1875, Zada Mary Cooper graduated from the University of Iowa College of Pharmacy in 1897 and became a registered pharmacist on March 9 of that year. Beginning as an assistant, she worked at the College of Pharmacy for 45 years, becoming an instructor in 1905, an assistant professor in 1912, and an associate professor in 1942.

Cooper helped found the Women's Section of the American Pharmacists Association in 1912. She served on its Executive and Membership committees from 1913 to 1916, and was elected its president in 1917.

She founded the pharmacy fraternity Kappa Epsilon on May 13, 1921. She was its first chair, a grand council member, and edited its journal, The Bond.

Cooper was also a founder of Rho Chi, an international honor society for pharmaceutical sciences. She held several of its offices, including secretary, executive council member, vice president, and served as president from 1938 to 1940.

She was active within the American Association of Colleges of Pharmacy, and was successful in lobbying the American Association of University Women to accept membership from graduates of pharmacy colleges.

After retiring in 1942, she lived with her brother Dr. J. Clark Cooper in Villisca, Iowa. She died on May 6, 1961.

Honors
Cooper was granted a membership in the national honor society Iota Sigma Pi and was, at the time, one of very few women listed in American Men of Science (it was not renamed American Men and Women of Science until 1971).

The Kappa Epsilon fraternity annually awards Zada M. Cooper Scholarships to five of its active collegiate members.

On April 30, 2016, the University of Iowa College of Pharmacy held the Zada Cooper Leadership Symposium, featuring several speakers on the subject of pharmacy education.

Selected publications
 "Why Apprentices Should Take a Course in College Before Engaging in Practice", Proceedings of the Iowa Pharmaceutical Association, 1904
 "Ladies as Druggists: Their Value to the Profession", Proceedings of the Iowa Pharmaceutical Association, 1905
 "The Ideal Pharmacist", Proceedings of the Iowa Pharmaceutical Association, 1906
 "Formula on the Bottle – Why Should the Druggists and the People Demand it", Proceedings of the Iowa Pharmaceutical Association, 1906
 "Co-operation Between Physicians and Pharmacists, The Advantages and How Best to Bright It About", Proceedings of the Iowa Pharmaceutical Association, 1909
 "Women in Pharmacy", The Druggists Circular, 1914
 "Some Phases of a Pharmacist's Duty to the Public", Journal of the American Pharmacists Association, 1914
 "Should a Library Reading Course Be Made a Part of the Curriculum of Colleges of Pharmacy", Journal of the American Pharmacists Association, 1916
 "Women Should be Urged to Study Pharmacy", The Druggists Circular, 1918
 "Where are Pharmacists Ten Years After Graduation from College", Journal of the American Pharmacists Association, 1919
 "Pharmaceutical Arithmetic", Spatula, 1922
 "The Lure of Research", Journal of the American Pharmacists Association, 1926

References

1875 births
1961 deaths
American pharmacists
People from Buchanan County, Iowa
College sorority founders
University of Iowa alumni
University of Iowa faculty
Women pharmacists